William Logan Harris (4 November 1817 – 2 September 1887) was an American bishop of the Methodist Episcopal Church, elected in 1872.

Birth and family
Harris was born near Ontario in Richland County, Ohio, a son of James and Mary (Logan) Harris.  His father died when William was sixteen years old.  William then made his home for some time with his uncle and guardian, Stephen Harris, (who was a brother of the Honorable John Harris of Stark County, Ohio).

Harris married Nancy Jane Atwell 9 August 1840. They had three children: Mary Celestina, Hattie Augusta, and William Hamilton (who married Grace Fancher Nicoll 1 December 1885).

Education

Harris attended the schools near his home. He was converted to the Christian faith 10 June 1834.  He entered the Norwalk Seminary (Norwalk, Ohio) shortly thereafter, pursuing a course of classical and mathematical studies.

Honorary degrees
Harris was honored by Allegheny College with the D.D. degree in 1856. He received an honorary LL.D. degree in 1870 from Baldwin University.

Ordained ministry
Harris united with the M.E. Church in 1834, and was Licensed to Preach in the early part of 1837. He was admitted on trial to the Michigan Annual Conference (which at that time covered northwestern Ohio as well) 7 September 1837. In 1840 he became a founding member of the North Ohio Annual Conference. When the conference boundaries were further realigned, he became a member of the Central Ohio Conference (aka the Delaware Ohio Conference).

Harris served in Ohio for eight years as pastor at, successively, Dover, Bellville, Amity, and Chesterville, and in 1844 was appointed to Delaware, Ohio. He also was an active abolitionist. In the time preceding the American Civil War, he took part in the discussion, writing books, pamphlets, etc. on this subject.

Academic ministry

Harris became a tutor (or instructor) at Ohio Wesleyan University, Delaware, Ohio in 1845. In 1846–47 he again entered pastoral work, appointed to Toledo. In 1848 he was assigned to Norwalk, Ohio. He was then elected Principal of the Baldwin Institute (later University), Berea, Ohio, remaining there from 1848 to 1851. In 1852 Harris was elected Professor of Chemistry and Natural History at Ohio Wesleyan, serving in this position for eight years.

Other ministry pursuits

In 1860 Harris was elected by the General Conference one of the Corresponding Secretaries of the Missionary Society of the M.E. Church, which office he held by quadrennial re-elections until his election to the episcopacy.

Harris was elected a delegate to the General Conferences of 1856–72, serving as secretary of that body at each of these quadrennial sessions. He also contributed largely to the periodical literature of his denomination.

Episcopal ministry
Harris was elected to the episcopacy of the M.E. Church by the General Conference of 1872 which met in Brooklyn, New York. Then during 1872–73, Harris made the first official episcopal tour ever made circumnavigating the globe (leaving from San Francisco), visiting M.E. Mission Stations in Japan, China, India, Bulgaria, and Western Europe. Harris also became recognized as an expert in Methodist church law.

Death and burial
Harris experienced symptoms of heart disease, being indisposed during an 1887 trip to England. Upon his return to New York he was unable to walk, and he died 2 September 1887 at his residence in New York City. He was buried in Rosehill Cemetery, Chicago.

Selected writings
 The Powers of the General Conference, 1859.
 Ecclesiastical Law and Rules of Evidence, written with Judge William J. Henry (of Illinois), with special reference to the government of the M.E. Church, 1870.

See also
List of bishops of the United Methodist Church

Notes

References
 Biographical/Genealogical information about the Harris Family from Rootsweb.com.
Methodism:  Ohio Area (1812-1962), edited by John M. Versteeg, Litt.D., D.D. (Ohio Area Sesquicentennial Committee, 1962).
 "Obituary", Bellville Star:  8 September 1887, Vol. 10, No. 50 (reprinted from the Mansfield News:  3 September 1887).

Attribution:

External links
 Picture of Bishop Harris

1817 births
1887 deaths
American Methodist Episcopal bishops
People from Richland County, Ohio
Heads of universities and colleges in the United States
Bishops of the Methodist Episcopal Church
American theologians
American religious writers
Burials at Rosehill Cemetery
American abolitionists
Activists from Ohio
Methodist abolitionists
19th-century Methodists
19th-century American clergy